= Madera Highlands, California =

Unincorporated community in California, United States

Madera Highlands
- Unincorporated community
- Location in California Madera Highlands (the United States)
- Coordinates: 37°00′40″N 120°04′52″W
- Country: United States
- State: California
- County: Madera
- Elevation: 269 ft (82 m)

Madera Highlands is an unincorporated community in Madera County, California, United States. It lies at an elevation of 269 feet (82 m).

== General Information ==
Madera Highlands is situated at an elevation of 269 feet (82 meters) and is part of the larger Madera area, which includes various neighborhoods and communities.

The area is characterized by residential developments, including newer housing projects such as Arbor at Madera Highlands, which offers amenities like walking paths, basketball courts, and community pools.

== Demographics ==
As of recent estimates, Madera County has a population of approximately 162,858 residents. The broader Madera area has seen steady growth, with a diverse demographic composition.

The community in Madera is ethnically diverse, with a significant Hispanic or Latino population. As of the most recent data, approximately 80.2% of the population identifies as Hispanic or Latino, while around 12.7% identify as White.
